Abby Roque (born September 25, 1997) is an American ice hockey forward, currently playing for the Minnesota section of the PWHPA. She is the first indigenous person to play for the U.S. women’s Olympic hockey team, making her Olympic debut in Beijing in 2022.

High school 

Roque began playing hockey at the age of six. Not having any options for girls' hockey, she played on boys' teams growing up. She played for the Sault Area High School Blue Devils in high school. During her freshman year, she was the only freshman to make the varsity hockey team. She was the first and only girl to play on the high school's boys' team. She was an alternate captain in her senior season with the Blue Devils. She tallied 16 goals and 20 assists in her senior year with the Blue Devils for a total of 36 points.

NCAA 
After graduating, she attended the University of Wisconsin, putting up 170 points in 155 NCAA games for the Badgers, twice being named WCHA Offensive Player of the Year. She was named WCHA Rookie of the Year in 2016–17, scoring 28 points in 40 games. In 2019, she scored the game-winning goal in the semi-finals as the university won the NCAA championship. She was named USCHO Division I Women's Player of the Year and USA Hockey's Women's Hockey Player of the Year in 2020, as well as being a top-3 finalist for the 2020 Patty Kazmaier Memorial Award.

After graduating, she joined the PWHPA, being named to the roster of the Minnesota section ahead of the 2020–21 season.

International 
Roque represented the United States at the 2014 and 2015 IIHF World Women's U18 Championship, winning gold in 2015. She participated in the 2019-20 Rivalry Series for the senior American national team and was named to the roster for the 2020 IIHF Women's World Championship before it was canceled due to the COVID-19 pandemic.

On January 2, 2022, Roque was named to Team USA's roster to represent the United States at the 2022 Winter Olympics.

PWHPA 
Skating for Team Minnesota during the 2020–21 PWHPA season, Roque participated in a PWHPA Dream Gap Tour event at New York's Madison Square Garden on February 28, 2021, the first women's ice hockey event at the venue. Playing for a team sponsored by Adidas, Roque logged a goal and two assists in a 4–3 loss.

Awards and honors

NCAA
2019 NCAA All-Tournament Team
2019-20 Preseason WCHA Co-Player of the Year 
2020 All-WCHA First Team 
2020 First Team All-American 
2020 WCHA Player of the Year 
2020 USCHO D-1 Women's Player of the Year

USA Hockey
2020 Bob Allen Women's Hockey Player of the Year (awarded by USA Hockey)

Personal life 

Roque is the daughter of Jim Roque, a former NCAA ice hockey coach who now works as a pro scout for the Toronto Maple Leafs of the National Hockey League. She is a member of the Wahnapitae First Nation tribe.  Roque has a bachelor's degree in marketing.

References

External links

1997 births
Living people
21st-century American women
21st-century First Nations people
First Nations sportspeople
First Nations women
Ojibwe people
People from Sault Ste. Marie, Michigan
Professional Women's Hockey Players Association players
Wisconsin Badgers women's ice hockey players
Ice hockey players at the 2022 Winter Olympics
Olympic ice hockey players of the United States
Medalists at the 2022 Winter Olympics
Olympic silver medalists for the United States in ice hockey
Native American sportswomen